Richard Tolkien is a British businessman and experienced adventure sailor who grew up in Devon.

This led to him taking on the ultimate challenge entering the 2000-2001 Vendee Globe a single person round the world race, but he did not make it all the way around the world as he was forced to retire on the 29th day of the race after suffering damage to his rig.

He planned a return to the Vendee Globe at the age of 61 for the 2016 edition. However, on 13 May 2015, while he was competing in The Transat Bakerly Race, a qualifying event, he was injured by a damaged sail and was forced to abandon his monohull. The Croatian cargo vessel Anton, which was heading for the United States, diverted to rescue him and evacuated him from the boat. The loss of the boat led to him not competing in the race.

References

Living people
British male sailors (sport)
British Vendee Globe sailors
2000 Vendee Globe sailors
IMOCA 60 class sailors
Alumni of the University of Oxford
Alumni of Exeter College, Oxford
1955 births